Oiketicus abbotii (Abbot's bagworm moth) is a moth of the family Psychidae. It is found in southeastern North America, including Florida and Louisiana.

There is strong sexual dimorphism in the adults.

External links
Bug Guide
Images

Psychidae
Moths described in 1880